De Groene Lantaarn is a restaurant located in Zuidwolde in the Netherlands. It is a fine dining restaurant that was awarded its first Michelin star in 2011 and held this until 2015; it received its second star in 2016.

Head chef is Jarno Eggen. The restaurant is a member of Les Patrons Cuisiniers.

The restaurant is housed in an old Saxonian farmhouse; the oldest parts of the farmhouse date from the end of the 1700s.

Around 1986–1987, there was already a restaurant De Groene Lantaarn located in the building, run by a person named mr. J.J. Vierstra. In 2000, it showed up as restaurant In de Groene Lantaarn with mr. Jan Jager as the owner. In May 2009, Jager sold the restaurant to Jarno Eggen and Cindy Donker. They both had worked at two-starred restaurant De Lindenhof in Giethoorn, Eggens as chef, Donker as maitre.

See also
List of Michelin starred restaurants in the Netherlands

References 

Restaurants in the Netherlands
Michelin Guide starred restaurants in the Netherlands